Ronald Donev (born 13 May 1991) is a Bulgarian footballer who last played for Tsarsko Selo as a defender. He is the son of former Bulgarian international forward Doncho Donev.

References

External links

1991 births
Living people
Bulgarian footballers
First Professional Football League (Bulgaria) players
Botev Plovdiv players
FC Lokomotiv 1929 Sofia players
PFC Svetkavitsa players
PFC Spartak Varna players
FC Septemvri Sofia players
FC Tsarsko Selo Sofia players
Association football defenders